The 2011 Carolina Challenge Cup was a four-team round robin pre-season competition hosted by the Charleston Battery. The 2011 Carolina Challenge Cup was contested among Charleston Battery, Chicago Fire, D.C. United, and Toronto FC, with D.C. United emerging as repeat champions.

Teams
Four clubs competed in the tournament:

Standings

Matches

Goal scorers
1 goal
 Stephen Armstrong (Charleston)
 Dane Kelly (Charleston)
 Mike Zaher (Charleston)
 Marco Pappa (Chicago)
 Blake Brettschneider (D.C.)
 Charlie Davies (D.C.)
 Joseph Ngwenya (D.C.)
 Chris Pontius (D.C.)
 Josh Wolff (D.C.)
 Dwayne De Rosario (Toronto)
 Maicon Santos (Toronto)
 Nathan Sturgis (Toronto)

See also
Carolina Challenge Cup

External links
 Major League Soccer returns to Charleston for 2011 Carolina Challenge Cup

2011
2011 in Canadian soccer
Car
Carolina Challenge
March 2011 sports events in the United States